USS Shark has been the name of more than one United States Navy ship, and may refer to:

 , a schooner commissioned in 1821 and wrecked in 1846
 , a submarine in commission from 1903 to 1919, renamed USS A-7 in 1911
 , a patrol vessel in commission from 1917 to 1919
 , a submarine commissioned in 1936 and sunk in 1942
 , a submarine commissioned in February 1944 and sunk in October 1944
 , a submarine in commission from 1961 to 1990

United States Navy ship names